Miandorud County is in Mazandaran province, Iran. The capital of the county is the city of Surak. At the 2006 census, the region's population (as Miandorud District of Sari County) was 53,862 in 14,224 households. It was separated from Sari County in 2010. The following census in 2011 counted 55,776 people in 16,670 households. At the 2016 census, the county's population was 55,053 in 18,253 households.

Administrative divisions

The population history and structural changes of Miandorud County's administrative divisions over three consecutive censuses are shown in the following table. The latest census shows two districts, five rural districts, and one city.

References

 

Counties of Mazandaran Province